is a , or incorporated educational institution of Japan registered under the  in 1951.

Overview 
Keio Gijuku was founded in Edo in 1858 by the Japanese educationist Fukuzawa Yukichi as an Anglo-Dutch style , and was meant to spread Western knowledge for modern civilisation. Later it was renamed "Keiō Gijuku" and was relocated in 1868 (Keiō 4). Today's Keio education system was formed under the Private Institutions Act of 1949 in the post-war era.

Attached school 
Keio Gijuku currently operates:

Higher Education

Secondary Education

Elementary Education

Language Education

References

Footnotes  

Keio University
School Corporations in Japan